Gorenje pri Divači is a settlement northwest of Divača in the Littoral region of Slovenia. It lies within the Municipality of Sežana.

Name
The name of the settlement was changed from Gorenje to Gorenje pri Divači in 1955.

References

External links

Gorenje pri Divači on Geopedia

Populated places in the Municipality of Sežana